Nicocles is a genus of robber flies in the family Asilidae. There are about 15 described species in Nicocles.

Species

References

Further reading

External links

 
 

Asilidae genera
Asilidae